SJK could refer to:
 São José dos Campos Regional Airport (IATA airport code) in Brazil
 Seinäjoen Jalkapallokerho, association football club from Seinäjoki, Finland
 Shinjuku Station, JR East station code
 St. John's-Kilmarnock School, Breslau, Ontario, Canada